Pool 3 of the 1987 Rugby World Cup began on 22 May and was completed on 1 June. The pool was composed of New Zealand, Fiji, Argentina and Italy.

Standings

New Zealand vs Italy

Argentina vs Fiji

New Zealand vs Fiji

Argentina vs Italy

Fiji vs Italy

New Zealand vs Argentina

External links

Official Rugby World Cup Site
Full Results and Statistics at ESPN

Pool 3
1987 in New Zealand rugby union
1987 in Argentine rugby union
1987 in Fijian rugby union
1987–88 in Italian rugby union